Justinas Marazas (born 23 February 2000) is a Lithuanian footballer who plays as a right midfielder for Riteriai, and the Lithuania national team.

Career
As professional started in 2017 m., when played first match in A Lyga. 

In first half of 2019 he was loaned and played in polish Wisla Plock.

In summer 2019 he returned to FK Riteriai.

Career in national team
Marazas made his international debut for Lithuania on 22 March 2019, coming on as a substitute for Saulius Mikoliūnas in the 76th minute of the UEFA Euro 2020 qualifying match against Luxembourg, which finished as a 1–2 away loss.

Career statistics

International

Honours
Individual
A Lyga Young Player of the Year: 2018
 A Lyga Young Player of the Month: April 2018

References

External links
 
 
 
 

2000 births
Living people
People from Elektrėnai Municipality
Lithuanian footballers
Lithuania youth international footballers
Lithuania under-21 international footballers
Lithuania international footballers
Lithuanian expatriate footballers
Lithuanian expatriate sportspeople in Poland
Expatriate footballers in Poland
Association football midfielders
FK Riteriai players
Wisła Płock players
A Lyga players
Ekstraklasa players